
Gmina Zielonki is a rural community (Polish: gmina) in Kraków County, Lesser Poland Voivodeship, in southern Poland.

The gmina contains part of the protected area called Dłubnia Landscape Park.

Villages
Gmina Zielonki contains the villages and settlements of Batowice, Bibice, Boleń, Bosutów, Brzozówka, Dziekanowice, Garlica Duchowna, Garlica Murowana, Garliczka, Grębynice, Januszowice, Korzkiew, Osiedle Łokietka, Owczary, Pękowice, Przybysławice, Trojanowice, Węgrzce, Wola Zachariaszowska and Zielonki.

Neighbouring gminas
Gmina Zielonki is bordered by the city of Kraków and by the gminas of Iwanowice, Michałowice, Skała and Wielka Wieś.

References
Polish official population figures 2006

Zielonki
Kraków County